Mark Feltham (born 20 October 1955, Bermondsey, Southwark, London) is an English musician, best known for playing harmonica with several artists including Oasis and Talk Talk. Feltham is a long-term member of the British blues rock band Nine Below Zero, and Rory Gallagher's band; and is often used as a session musician.

In an interview on the South Bank Show broadcast in 1981, Nine Below Zero guitarist and singer Dennis Greaves noted that Feltham's 'nan' had played the harmonica and his dad bought him his first instrument. Greaves also stated that Feltham had been playing in his bedroom for 11 years, but had given the instrument up for a time before joining Nine Below Zero, his first band.  In addition, when he joined he did not know how to play through a microphone or what an amplifier was. Greaves also noted that Feltham studied the music of Little Walter, Charlie McCoy and Junior Wells.

Selected discography

Albums
Nine Below Zero: Live at the Marquee (1980); Don't Point Your Finger (1981); Third Degree (1983); On The Road Again (1991); Chilled (2002); Hats Off (2004); It's Never Too Late (2009); 13 Shades Of Blue (2016); Avalanche (2019)
The Alarm: Marchin' On (1982)
Box of Frogs: Box of Frogs (1984)
Anthony Moore: The Only Choice (1984)
Mick Clarke: Rock Me (1985)
Anri: Trouble in Paradise (1986)
Rory Gallagher: Defender (1987); Fresh Evidence (1990); Etched in Blue (1992); Live in Cork (1994); Meeting with the G-Man (2003); Blue Day for the Blues (1995); Wheels Within Wheels (2003); Big Guns (2005)
Roger Daltrey: Under a Raging Moon (1985): Move Better in the Night / It Don't Satisfy Me
Dave Kelly: Lonesome Man Blues (1986)
Paul Young: The Secret of Association (1985): I Was in Chains
Joolz: Hex (1987)
Manfred Mann's Earth Band: Masque (1987)
New Model Army: The Ghost of Cain (1986): Poison Street / Ballad; Eight (2000); Someone Like Jesus / Mixam
Talk Talk: The Colour of Spring (1986): Living in Another World; Spirit of Eden (1988); Laughing Stock (1991); London '86; Missing Pieces (2001)
Scarlet Fantastic: 24hrs (1988): Lucky Seven / Stay
Roachford: Roachford (1988): Lying Again / Nobody But You
Godley & Creme: Goodbye Blue Sky (1988)
The The: Mind Bomb (1989): Kingdom of Rain / Good Morning Beautiful / The Beat(en) Generation / The Violence of Truth
Deacon Blue: When the World Knows Your Name (1989): Love & Regret / Your Constant Heart
The Truth: Jump (1989)
Nazareth: Snakes 'n' Ladders (1989)
Roger Chapman: Walking The Cat (1989)
The Adventures: Trading Secrets With the Moon (1990): Don't Blame It on the Moon
Andrew Ridgeley: Son of Albert (1990): Big Machine / Baby Jane /  The Price of Love
Frazier Chorus: Ray (1990)
Roy Harper: Once (1990): Nowhere To Run To / Once
Sunsonic: Melting Down on Motor Angel (1990): Drive Away
The Almighty: Soul Destruction (1991): Hell To Pay
Alison Limerick: And I Still Rise (1992): Trouble
Innocence: Build (1992): Looking For Someone
The Lightning Seeds: Sense (1992): Sense
Skeleton Crew: Blue Mania (1992): Mother Earth / Watch Your Step / Blues Got Me / Trail of Tears / Mississippi Burning
Dave Allison / Phil Brown / Mark Hollis: AV Installation (1993)
Indecent Obsession: Relativity (1993)
Little Angels: Jam (1993)
Mitch Malloy: Ceilings & Walls (1993)
Billy Rain: Salad Days (1994)
Javier Paxarino / Glen Velez: Temura (1994)
.O.Rang: Herd of Instinct (1994)
Sasha: Magic (1994): Higher Ground
Annie Lennox: Medusa (1995)
Atlantique: Atlantique (1995)
Londonbeat: Londonbeat (1995)
Catherine Wheel: Happy Days (1995)
Peter Smith: Together (1995)
Steve Jansen / Richard Barbieri:  Stone To Flesh (1995) Mother London / Everything Ends in Darkness
The Almighty: Just Add Life (1996)
Box of Frogs: Strange Land (1996) Back Where I Started
Catherine Wheel: Like Cats & Dogs (1996): Wish You Were Here
Inaura: One Million Smiles (1996): Desire
Talbot & White: Off The Beaten Track (1996): Til The Cows Come Home
Terrorvision: Regular Urban Survivors (1996)
Joe Cocker: Across from Midnight (1997)
Oasis: Be Here Now (1997): All Around The World
Paul Carrack: Winter Wonderland (1997): Beautiful World
PJ Proby: Legend (1997): When
Robbie Williams: Life Thru a Lens (1997): South of the Border / Let Me Entertain You
The Everly Brothers: Whistle Down The Wind (1998): Cold
Mark Hollis: Mark Hollis (1998)
Oasis: The Masterplan (1998)
Roger Chapman: Turn Unstoned (1998)
Zucchero: Bluesugar (1998)
Dido: No Angel (1999): I'm No Angel
Faultline: Closer Colder (1999): Partyline Honey
Kevin Rowland: My Beauty (1999): Rag Doll / Daydream Believer / This Guys in Love With You / I can't Tell The Bottom From The Top / Reflections of My Life
The Robbie McIntosh Band: Emotional Bends (1999)
Spooky Tooth, Cross Purpose (1999)
Oasis: Standing on the Shoulder of Giants (2000): Gas Panic
Michael Ball: This Time It's Personal (2000)
Micky Moody: I Eat Them For Breakfast (2000)
Robbie McIntosh: Widescreen (2000)
Robbie Williams: Sing When You're Winning (2000): Forever Texas
Texas: Greatest Hits (2000): I Don't Want A Lover / Everyday Now
Chris Shields: Sky Turn Blue (2001): Haunt Me / The Fool
Five: Kingsize (2001); C'mon C'mon
Luther Grosvenor: Floodgates Anthology (2001)
Ocean Colour Scene: Mechanical Wonder (2001)
Roger Chapman: Rollin' & Tumblin''' (2001)
Archive: You All Look the Same to Me (2002): AgainBeth Gibbons & Rustin Man / Tom The Model: Out of Season (2002)
Justin Sullivan: Navigating by the Stars (2003)
Karl Jenkins: Adiemus V: Vocalise (2003): Mi Contra Fa / Diablous in MusicaMark Owen: In Your Own Time (2003)
Skin: Fleshwounds (2003)
Will Young: Friday's Child (2003)
Cactus World News: No Shelter (2004)
Zucchero: Zuccero & Co (2004)
David Charvet: Se Laisser Quelque Chose (2005)
Will Young: Keep On (2005): Switch It OnSwitchfoot: Oh Gravity (2006)
Gary Moore: Close As You Get (2007); Checkin' Up on My Baby / Hard TimesNasio Fontaine: Rise Up (2007): Universal CityGary Fletcher: Human Spirit (2007)
Gabriella Cilmi: Lessons To Be Learned (2008) Sweet About MeBlue Ox Babes: Apples & Oranges (2009)
Johnny Cash: Remixed (2009)
Lucas Renney: Strange Glory (2009)
Gary Barlow: Since I Saw You Last (2013)
Steven Wilson: To The Bone (2017): To The Bone / "Refuge"

Singles
Nine Below Zero: "Homework" (1980)
Talk Talk: "Living in Another World" (1986)
New Model Army: "Poison Street" (1987)
The Christians: "Harvest for the World" (1988)
The The: "The Beat(en) Generation" (1989)
Deacon Blue: "Love and Regret" (1989); "Wages Day" (1989)
The KLF: "Justified & Ancient" (1991)
The KLF: "Last Train to Transcentral" (1991)
Tom Jones & New Model Army: "Gimme Shelter" (1993)
Oasis: "Whatever" (1994); "All Around The World" (1998); Round Are Way (1995)
Mike Flowers Pops: "Wonderwall" (1995)
Will Young: "Switch It On" (2005)
Gabriella Cilmi: "Sweet About Me" (2008)

DVD
New Model Army: Live 161203 (2003)
Nine Below Zero: Bring It On HomeNine Below Zero: On The Road AgainNine Below Zero: Sights and Sounds Vol 1Rory Gallagher: Live at Cork Opera House (2006)

Film soundtracksTootsie (1982)Judge Dredd (1995)Lock, Stock and Two Smoking Barrels (1998)The Mighty (1998)Notting Hill (1999)Lucky Break (2001)Once Upon a Time in the Midlands (2002)Sweet Home Alabama'' (2003)

References

External links
 accompanying Oasis (band) in 1996 on Round Are Way

1955 births
Living people
People from Bermondsey
Musicians from London
People from Westminster
English blues musicians
British harmonica players
Harmonica blues musicians